Dmitriy Plechistik (born 26 July 1972) is a Belarusian rower. He competed in the men's coxless pair event at the 1996 Summer Olympics.

References

1972 births
Living people
Belarusian male rowers
Olympic rowers of Belarus
Rowers at the 1996 Summer Olympics
Sportspeople from Minsk